Docker is a hamlet in the civil parish of Whittington, Lancashire, England. It is in the City of Lancaster district, north of Arkholme and south west of Whittington.

There are two grade 2 listed buildings: Docker Hall farmhouse and Docker Cottage.

The Victoria County History records that the township of Whittington "was formerly divided into two parts, Whittington proper to the north ... and Newton with Docker to the south", and its earliest mention of Docker is a "Henry Brabin of Docker" (1585).

References

Hamlets in Lancashire
Geography of the City of Lancaster